Gulf Stream Coach, Inc. is based in Nappanee, Indiana and has additional factories in Goshen and Etna Green, Indiana.

The company is the largest privately held full-line recreational vehicle manufacturer in North America, offering 26 brands and more than 100 models, while employing over 1,500 men and women in Elkhart County. 

The company was established in 1983 and grew out of a previous family business that made mobile homes.

External links
Official site

Recreational vehicle manufacturers
Companies based in Elkhart County, Indiana
Vehicle manufacturing companies established in 1983